London, a Canadian city located in Southwestern Ontario along the Quebec City–Windsor Corridor, has received numerous royal visits since 1939. The late Canadian monarch, Queen Elizabeth II, first visited in 1973, and subsequent visits have been made by other members of the Canadian Royal Family since then.

Prince Philip visit to London Ontario for Presentation of New Queen's Colours to the First and Third Battalion The Royal Canadian Regiment London Ontario 23 October 1969
Worsley Barracks.

List of royal visits by date

References 

London, Ontario
London
Monarchy in Canada